Hahnaman Township is located in Whiteside County, Illinois. As of the 2010 census, its population was 399 and it contained 148 housing units.

History
Hahnaman Township was named for Samuel Hahnemann, founder of homeopathy.

Geography

Demographics

References

External links
City-data.com
Whiteside County Official Site

Townships in Whiteside County, Illinois
Townships in Illinois